Taibaishanus is a monotypic genus of East Asian sheet weavers containing the single species, Taibaishanus elegans. It was first described by A. V. Tanasevitch in 2006, and has only been found in China.

See also
 List of Linyphiidae species (Q–Z)

References

Linyphiidae
Monotypic Araneomorphae genera
Spiders of China